Eamon Duffy  (born 1947) is an Irish historian. He is a professor of the history of Christianity at the University of Cambridge, and a Fellow and former president of Magdalene College.

Early life
Duffy was born on 9 February 1947, in Dundalk, Ireland. He describes himself as a "cradle Catholic". He was educated at St Philip's School and the University of Hull. He undertook postgraduate research at the University of Cambridge, where his doctoral advisers were Owen Chadwick and Gordon Rupp.

Academic career
Duffy specialises in 15th- to 17th-century religious history of Britain. He is also a former member of the Pontifical Historical Commission. His work has done much to overturn the popular image of late-medieval Catholicism in England as moribund, and instead presents it as a vibrant cultural force. On weekdays from 22 October to 2 November 2007, he presented the BBC Radio 4 series 10 Popes Who Shook the World – those popes featured were Peter, Leo I, Gregory I, Gregory VII, Innocent III, Paul III, Pius IX, Pius XII, John XXIII, and John Paul II.

Prizes and awards 
 Longman–History Today Award for book of the year (1994): The Stripping of the Altars: Traditional Religion in England 1400–1580
 Hawthornden Prize for Literature (2002): The Voices of Morebath: Reformation and Rebellion in an English Village
 Honorary fellow, St Mary's College, Twickenham (2003). (He later resigned from the position in protest of management decisions at the college made by its principal, Philip Esler)
President of the Ecclesiastical History Society (2004–2005)
 Honorary doctorates from the universities of Durham, Hull, and King's College London, and from the Pontifical Institute of Medieval Studies, Toronto
 Honorary Member of the Royal Irish Academy (2012)
 Honorary Canon, Ely Cathedral (2014)

Books
 Humanism, Reform and the Reformation: The Career of Bishop John Fisher (1989), with Brendan Bradshaw
The Stripping of the Altars: Traditional Religion in England, c.1400 to c.1580 (1992; subsequent editions in 2005 and 2022)
 
 The Voices of Morebath: Reformation and Rebellion in an English Village (2001)
 "The Shock of Change: Continuity and Discontinuity in the Elizabethan Church of England", in Anglicanism and the Western Catholic Tradition (2003) 
 Faith of Our Fathers: Reflections on Catholic Tradition (2004)
 Walking to Emmaus (2006)
 Marking the Hours: English People and Their Prayers, 1240–1570 (2006)
 Faith of Our Fathers: Reflections on Catholic Tradition (2006)
 Fires of Faith: Catholic England Under Mary Tudor (2009)
 Ten Popes Who Shook the World (2011)
 Saints, Sacrilege and Sedition: Religion and Conflict in the Tudor Reformations (2012) 
 Reformation Divided: Catholics, Protestants, and the Conversion of England (2017)
 The Hope That Is Within You – Eamon Duffy in Conversation with Raymond Friel (2017)
 Royal Books and Holy Bones: Essays in Medieval Christianity (2018) 
 John Henry Newman: A Very Brief History (2019)
 A People's Tragedy: Studies in Reformation (2020)

References

Further reading
 Eamon Duffy, "Far from the Tree" (review of Rob Iliffe, Priest of Nature: the Religious Worlds of Isaac Newton, Oxford, Oxford University Press, 2017), The New York Review of Books, vol. LXV, no. 4 (8 March 2018), pp. 28–29.

External links

 Duffy's faculty page
 PBS interview with Duffy
 Red Cross Lecture 2015: Fact, Fiction And The Tudor Past

1947 births
Living people
20th-century Irish historians
20th-century Irish male writers
20th-century Roman Catholics
21st-century Irish historians
21st-century Irish male writers
21st-century Roman Catholics
Alumni of the University of Cambridge
Alumni of the University of Hull
Fellows of Magdalene College, Cambridge
Fellows of the British Academy
Fellows of the Society of Antiquaries of London
Historians of the Catholic Church
Irish emigrants to the United Kingdom
Irish historians of religion
Irish Roman Catholics
New Blackfriars people
People educated at St Philip's School
People from Dundalk
Presidents of the Ecclesiastical History Society
Reformation historians
Roman Catholic scholars